John Robert Logan, nicknamed Tip Logan (November 30, 1927 – November 25, 2007), was a Canadian football player who played for the Hamilton Tiger Cats. He won the Grey Cup with them in 1953. Born in Fort Erie, Ontario, he previously attended Queen's University. Logan later worked as an insurance agent in Hamilton. He died in 2007.

References

Hamilton Tiger-Cats players
Players of Canadian football from Ontario
Sportspeople from Fort Erie, Ontario
1927 births
2007 deaths